Aristocosma chrysophilana is a species of moth of the family Tortricidae. It is found in Australia, where it has been recorded from New South Wales.

References

Moths described in 1863
Archipini
Moths of Australia